Waitin' for the Sun to Shine is the third studio album from Ricky Skaggs.  It was released in 1981 on Epic Records.  Skaggs himself produced the album, and played on all the songs.

Four of the ten tracks were released as singles; "Don't Get Above Your Raisin'" peaked at number 16 on the U.S. Country charts, while charting at number 47 in Canada.  The next three singles were much more successful.  "You May See Me Walkin'" got to number nine in the U.S., and reached number 16 in Canada, while "Cryin' My Heart Out Over You" and "I Don't Care" were both number one hits in the U.S. (while reaching number 3 & 2, respectively, in Canada).

The album itself went to number 2 on the country charts in the States and went gold.  It was also his first time on the pop charts, where the album went to number 77.

Track listing
"If That's the Way You Feel" (Ralph Stanley) (The Stanley Brothers cover) - 3:05
"Don't Get Above Your Raisin'" (Lester Flatt, Earl Scruggs) (Flatt & Scruggs cover) - 3:10
"Your Old Love Letters" (Johnny Bond) (Jim Reeves cover) - 2:55
"Low and Lonely" (Floyd Jenkins (aka Fred Rose)) (Roy Acuff cover) - 2:55
"Waitin' for the Sun to Shine" (Sonny Throckmorton) - 3:47
"You May See Me Walkin'" (Tom Uhr) - 2:25
"Crying My Heart Out Over You" (Carl Butler, Louise Certain Scruggs, Gladys Stacey Flatt, George Earl Sherry (aka Troy Martin)) (Flatt & Scruggs cover) - 2:58
"Lost to a Stranger" (Frank "Hylo" Brown, Jr.) (Hylo Brown cover) - 2:50
"I Don't Care" (Webb Pierce, Cindy Walker) (Webb Pierce cover) - 2:15
"So Round, So Firm, So Fully Packed" (Merle Travis, Eddie Kirk, Cliffie Stone) (Merle Travis cover) - 2:50

Production 
 Ricky Skaggs – producer 
 Marshall Morgan – engineer 
 Pat McMakin – assistant engineer
 Glenn Meadows – mastering at Masterfonics (Nashville, Tennessee)
 Virginia Team – art direction 
 Beverly Parker – photography

Personnel 
 Ricky Skaggs – lead vocals, acoustic guitar (1, 2, 3, 5-10), mandolin (2, 10), backing vocals (3-7, 9, 10), acoustic rhythm guitar (4), electric rhythm guitar (4)
 Buck White – acoustic piano (1-4, 7-10)
 Dennis Burnside – acoustic piano (5, 6), Fender Rhodes (5)
 Ray Flacke – electric guitars 
 Sonny Curtis – acoustic lead guitar (5)
 Bruce Bouton – steel guitar (1, 3-10)
 Jerry Douglas – dobro (2)
 Joe Osborn – bass
 Jerry Kroon – drums
 Bobby Hicks – fiddle (1, 3, 4, 7-10)
 Cheryl White Warren – vocal percussion (1)
 Sharon White – backing vocals (1, 3, 9)
 Lea Jane Berinati – backing vocals (5)

Chart performance

References

1981 albums
Epic Records albums
Ricky Skaggs albums
Albums produced by Ricky Skaggs